Kwamina is an album by American jazz pianist Billy Taylor featuring jazz interpretations of compositions from the Broadway musical Kwamina written by Richard Adler which was recorded in 1961 and released on the Mercury label.

Reception

Allmusic awarded the album 3 stars stating "the music never seriously grabs the listener's attention, though the musicians are playing up to the level one expects of them. Serious Billy Taylor fans will undoubtedly still want to search for this obscure, long unavailable record".

Track listing
All compositions by Richard Adler
 "Something Big" - 3:36   
 "I'm Seeing Rainbows" - 2:54   
 "Ordinary People" - 4:21   
 "The Cocoa Bean Song" - 3:12   
 "What's Wrong With Me" - 2:53   
 "Nothing More to Look Forward To" - 4:34   
 "Another Time, Another Place" - 3:40   
 "Happy Is the Cricket" - 4:23   
 "Sun Is Beginning to Crow" - 3:08

Personnel 
Billy Taylor - piano
Clark Terry - trumpet, flugelhorn 
Julius Watkins - French horn 
Jimmy Cleveland - trombone 
Phil Woods - alto saxophone
Frank Wess - tenor saxophone
Jerome Richardson - baritone saxophone 
Les Spann - guitar 
George Duvivier - bass
Osie Johnson - drums
Jimmy Jones Jr. - arranger

References 

1961 albums
Billy Taylor albums
Mercury Records albums